Fortid is a quarterly Norwegian academic journal of history run and edited by history students at the University of Oslo. The journal was established in 2004. It publishes academic essays and book reviews on all aspects of history. It is part of Tidsskriftforeningen and is distributed by InterPress. In 2006, the journal won the University of Oslo's "Best student-edited publication"-award, and the reception among both students, historians, and the wider public has been positive.

Editors
As the journal is run by volunteers, the position of editor-in-chief is usually shared by two people. The following persons have been editors-in-chief:
2004-2005: Gunnar Jakobsen
2006: Jardar Sørvoll (nr. 1-3), Håkon Evju (nr. 4)
2007: Håkon Evju (nr. 1-2), Johannes Due Enstad & Anette Wilhelmsen (nr. 3-4)
2008: Johannes Due Enstad & Anette Wilhelmsen (nr. 1-3), Marie Lund Alveberg & Marthe Glad Munch-Møller (nr. 4)
2009: Marthe Glad Munch-Møller & Marie Lund Alveberg (nr. 1-2), Marthe Glad Munch-Møller & Øystein Idsø Viken (nr. 3), Øystein Idsø Viken & Haakon Ikonomou (nr. 4)
2010: Nina Maria Rud & Espen Thoen
2011: Kristin Li & Sveinung Kasin Boye
2012: Aslak Kittelsen & Henriette Mikkelsen Hoel (nr. 1-3), Henriette Mikkelsen Hoel & Erik Tobias Taube (nr. 4)
2013: Henriette Mikkelsen Hoel & Erik Tobias Taube (nr. 1), Erik Tobias Taube & Miriam Finset Ingvaldsen (nr. 2-3), Miriam Finset Ingvaldsen & Henrik Mathiesen (nr. 4).
2014: Henrik Mathiesen & Fredrikke Holt Skråmm.
2014-2015: Mari Torsdotter Hauge
2015-2016: Nora Rodin & Skage A. Østberg
2017-2018: Anna-Marie S. Nesheim & Even N. Bergseng
2018-2019: Eli Morken Farstad & Erlend Lundvall
2019-2020: Charlotte Aslesen & Jonas Fostervoll Øverland

Curriculum
Articles from Fortid have been used as curriculum by the University of Tromsø, the University of Nordland and the University of Oslo.

References

External links

History journals
Publications established in 2004
Quarterly journals
Norwegian-language journals
Academic journals edited by students
Magazines published in Oslo